The third season of the television series Angel, the spin-off of Buffy the Vampire Slayer, premiered on September 24, 2001 on The WB and concluded its 22-episode season on May 20, 2002. The season aired in a new timeslot, Mondays at 9:00 pm ET. This was the first season where Angel and Buffy did not air on the same network, as Buffy had moved to the UPN network beginning with its sixth season.

Cast and characters

Main cast 
 David Boreanaz as Angel
 Charisma Carpenter as Cordelia Chase
 Alexis Denisof as Wesley Wyndam-Pryce
 J. August Richards as Charles Gunn
 Amy Acker as Winifred "Fred" Burkle

Recurring cast

Crew 
Series creators Joss Whedon and David Greenwalt served as executive producers, while Greenwalt would serve as the series' showrunner as Whedon was running Buffy and developing his new series, Firefly. Whedon wrote and directed one episode during the season; "Waiting in the Wings". Greenwalt wrote four of the season's episodes and directed two, the premiere and the finale. Tim Minear was promoted to executive producer midseason and wrote and/or directed six episodes of the season including important, Connor-centric episodes such as "Lullaby", "A New World" and "Benediction". Buffy writer/producer Marti Noxon served as consulting producer for her final season on Angel, as she was also running Buffy since she was promoted to executive producer. Buffy writer David Fury wrote one freelance episode, and he officially joined the writing staff in the following season.

The only other returning writer was Mere Smith, who was promoted to story editor. New additions included Jeffrey Bell, who wrote and/or co-wrote six episodes during the season, and served as co-producer, then promoted to producer midseason. Scott Murphy was hired as story editor, although he only wrote two episodes in the first half of the season. Buffy script coordinator David H. Goodman was hired to write two freelance episodes.

This was the last season in which both David Greenwalt and Tim Minear served as full-time writer-producers, as Minear left to help develop Whedon's new series, Firefly and Greenwalt left as his contract with Fox was up. They both served as consulting producers for subsequent seasons.

Writer Tim Minear directed the highest number of episodes in the third season, directing four episodes.

Episodes

Crossovers with Buffy the Vampire Slayer 
The third season of Angel coincided with the sixth season of Buffy the Vampire Slayer. With this season, Buffy switched networks from The WB to UPN, while Angel still remained on The WB. Because they were on competing networks, there were no official crossovers. At the time, WB Entertainment President Jordan Levin stated "There will be no crossovers between Angel and Buffy. I think it's more important, in the long term, that Angel really establishes itself as a world that obviously comes from the same mythology, but operates with its own set of principles, guidelines and characters, and really establishes itself independently from Buffy."

Reception 
The third season was nominated for three Saturn Awards – Best Network Television Series, Best Actor on Television (David Boreanaz) and Female Cinescape Genre Face of the Future Award (Amy Acker). The episode "Waiting in the Wings" was nominated for a Hugo Award for Best Dramatic Presentation, Short Form.

The Futon Critic named "Billy" the 36th best episode of 2001 and "That Vision Thing" the 14th best episode of 2001.

The third season averaged 4.4 million viewers, slightly lower than the sixth season of Buffy.

DVD release 
Angel: The Complete Third Season was released on DVD in region 1 on February 10, 2004 and in region 2 on March 3, 2003. The DVD includes all 22 episodes on 6 discs presented in anamorphic widescreen 1.78:1 aspect ratio. Special features on the DVD include three commentary tracks—"Billy" by writers Tim Minear and Jeffrey Bell; "Lullaby" by writer/director Tim Minear and Mere Smith; and "Waiting in the Wings" by writer/director Joss Whedon. There are two sets of deleted scenes, for "Birthday" with commentary by Tim Minear and Mere Smith and "Waiting in the Wings" with commentary by Joss Whedon. Featurettes include, "Darla: Deliver Us From Evil", a featurette on the character of Darla with interviews with actress Julie Benz; "Page to Screen" which details the process from the script to the completed episode; and "Season 3 Overview" is a summary of the season featuring interviews with cast and crew members. Also included are screen tests for Amy Acker and Vincent Kartheiser, series outtakes, and photo galleries.

References

External links 
 

Angel (1999 TV series)
 
2001 American television seasons
2002 American television seasons
Television shows about revenge
Child abduction in television